Henry Armstrong Miller (born July 16, 1969) is a former sumo wrestler, raised in St. Louis, Missouri, who competed under the shikona . The first wrestler from the US mainland to reach the top makuuchi division, he made his professional debut in 1988 and reached a highest rank of maegashira 12 before retiring in 2003. He last competed in MMA as recently as 2013, losing to Kazuhiro Nakamura.

Early life
He was born in Tachikawa, Tokyo, Japan, the son of a Japanese mother and African-American father. He was born on the same day that the Apollo 11 lunar mission left Earth and his middle name was given to him by his father in honor of Neil Armstrong. He lived on Yokota Air Base until the age of six, when he moved with his family to St Louis, Missouri. He grew up in Ferguson. His dream of becoming a professional football player was ended by a knee injury in his senior year of high school, but he had also been wrestling since elementary school and he had qualified for the state championships. After graduating in 1987 he returned to Japan to try professional sumo.

Sumo career
He joined the Tomozuna stable of wrestlers, also the home of future ozeki Kaio. He was given the shikona of Sentoryū, meaning "fighting war dragon" but also a play on words for his hometown of St. Louis. He was relatively small at 174 cm and 94 kg when he made his debut in July 1988. He won the yusho or tournament championship in his first official tournament in the jonokuchi division in September 1988, defeating a fellow American, Shinnishiki from Los Angeles. In 1991 he reached makushita for the first time but injury problems meant he did not establish himself in the division until 1993. In November 1994 he became a sekitori for the first time but lasted only two tournaments in the jūryō division before being demoted.

It took Sentoryū more than four years of hard toil in the unsalaried makushita division (including a change of name to Kaishinzan in 1997) before he could win promotion back to the second division in July 1999, after an unbeaten 7-0 yusho in May. His final day victory over the former amateur champion Kototamiya (the future ozeki Kotomitsuki) was regarded as one of the high points of his career.

After reverting to the name Sentoryū, a strong 13-2 record in March 2000 sent him to the top of the jūryō division. With an 8-7 mark in May 2000, he finally achieved his goal of promotion to the top makuuchi division in July. It had taken him 72 tournaments from his professional debut to reach makuuchi, which is the slowest amongst foreign-born wrestlers.

Sentoryū came through with a winning record of 8-7 in his debut but was then demoted after only recording a 5-10 score in September 2000. He had to withdraw from the following tournament in November and missed the January 2001 basho. Nevertheless, he managed to hold his own in jūryō and had one more visit to the top division in January 2002. However, he suffered a serious injury and was unable to compete in the March and May 2002 tournaments, falling all the way back to makushita. He refused to give up and fought his way back to sekitori status in September 2003, becoming the fifth oldest wrestler to return to jūryō in the postwar era at 34 years, 1 month. However, another injury convinced him to retire at the end of the year, in the same tournament as Musashimaru. His great fighting spirit, despite all his injuries, won him many admirers. He had spent 20 tournaments as a sekitori, by far the most successful career by anyone from the contiguous United States.

He defeated Asashōryū in their only meeting in November 2000, when both were in the jūryō division. He also had three wins over Kotomitsuki in their four meetings.

Fighting style
Sentoryū favoured pushing and thrusting techniques, winning most of his matches by oshi dashi (push out), hatakikomi (slap down) or hikiotoshi (pull down).

Mixed martial arts and kickboxing career
Since his retirement from sumo, Sentoryū tried his luck at mixed martial arts. He was recommended for PRIDE in April 2004 by Chiyotaikai Ryūji, who saw Akebono Taro make such transition a year before.

He has six wins and sixteen losses in his 23 fights to date. He styles himself Henry "Sentoryu" Miller.  He made an agreement with World Victory Road and fought Yoshihiro Nakao. On 25 December 2010 he faced Yoichi Babaguchi (former sekiwake Wakashoyo) in the first ever K-1 kickboxing match between former sekitori. There was an edge to the match because Miller blamed Babaguchi for an injury he sustained in a sumo bout between the two in November 1994 (his debut juryo tournament). Miller won the match in the first round.

Sumo career record

Kickboxing record

|-
|
|Win
| Wakashoyo
|Survivor: Round 6
|Tokyo, Japan
|TKO (3 knockdowns)
|align="center"|1
|align="center"|1:09
|1-2
| 
|-
|
|Loss
| Tsutomu Takahagi
|Big Bang 2: The Way to Unification
|Japan
|TKO (corner stoppage)
|align="center"|2
|align="center"|1:09
|0-2
| 
|-
|
|Loss
| Taiei Kin
|K-1 World Grand Prix 2007 in Hong Kong
|Hong Kong
|KO (right high kick)
|align="center"|1
|align="center"|1:43
|0-1
|2007 Hong Kong Grand Prix quarter-final bout.
|-
|-
| colspan=10 | Legend:

Mixed martial arts record

|-
|Loss
|align=center|6-16 (1)
| Kazuhiro Nakamura
|KO (punch)
|DEEP: 63 Impact
|
|align=center|1
|align=center|4:42
|Tokyo, Japan
|Openweight bout.
|-
|Loss
|align=center|6-15 (1)
| Soa Palelei
|TKO (punches)
|K-Oz Entertainment: Bragging Rights
|
|align=center|1
|align=center|1:26
|Perth, Western Australia, Australia
|
|-
|Loss
|align=center|6-14 (1)
| Shunsuke Inoue
|TKO (punches)
|HEAT 20
|
|align=center|1
|align=center|1:43
|Tokyo, Japan
|
|-
|Loss
|align=center|6-13 (1)
| Myles Tynanes
|TKO (punches)
|HEAT 19
|
|align=center|1
|align=center|3:29
|Nagoya, Japan
|
|-
|Loss
|align=center|6-12 (1)
| Takaaki Oban
|Submission (rear-naked choke)
|Gladiator 23
|
|align=center|1
|align=center|1:40
|Hiroshima, Japan
|
|-
|Loss
|align=center|6-11 (1)
| Taiei Kin
|TKO (corner stoppage)
|HEAT 16
|
|align=center|1
|align=center|4:01
|Osaka, Japan
|
|-
|Loss
|align=center|6-10 (1)
| Yoshihiro Nakao
|TKO (punches)
|Sengoku Raiden Championships 12
|
|align=center|2
|align=center|3:27
|Tokyo, Japan
|
|-
|Win
|align=center|6-9 (1)
| Kim Min-Soo
|KO (punches and knees)
|The Khan 2
|
|align=center|1
|align=center|1:12
|Seoul, South Korea
|
|-
|Loss
|align=center|5-9 (1)
| Lee Chang-Seob
|TKO (punches)
|HEAT 12
|
|align=center|1
|align=center|0:53
|Nagoya, Japan
|
|-
|Loss
|align=center|5-8 (1)
| Cristiano Kaminishi
|TKO (punches)
|HEAT 11
|
|align=center|3
|align=center|3:36
|Tokyo, Japan
|Openweight bout.
|-
| NC
|align=center|5-7 (1)
| Cristiano Kaminishi
|No contest (groin strike)
|HEAT 10
|
|align=center|1
|align=center|0:54
|Tokyo, Japan
|
|-
|Win
|align=center|5-7
| Ryuta Noji
|KO (punches)
|HEAT 9
|
|align=center|1
|align=center|1:14
|Nagoya, Japan
|
|-
|Win
|align=center|4-7
| Junpei Hamada
|KO (punches)
|HEAT 8
|
|align=center|1
|align=center|0:52
|Tokyo, Japan
|
|-
|Loss
|align=center|3-7
| Cristiano Kaminishi
|KO (head kick)
|DEEP: 29 Impact
|
|align=center|1
|align=center|4:00
|Tokyo, Japan
|
|-
|Win
|align=center|3-6
| Kim Ji-Fun
|KO (punch)
|HEAT 3
|
|align=center|1
|align=center|4:58
|Nagoya, Japan
|
|-
|Loss
|align=center|2-6
| Mostapha al-Turk
|TKO (punches)
|Cage Rage 18
|
|align=center|1
|align=center|0:56
|London, England
|
|-
|Win
|align=center|2-5
| Seiji Ogura
|Submission (rear-naked choke)
|Pancrase
|
|align=center|1
|align=center|1:37
|Yokohama, Japan
|
|-
|Loss
|align=center|1-5
| Robert Berry
|TKO (punches)
|Cage Rage 17
|
|align=center|1
|align=center|1:06
|London, England
|
|-
|Loss
|align=center|1-4
| Zuluzinho
|TKO (knees)
|PRIDE 30
|
|align=center|1
|align=center|1:31
|Saitama, Saitama, Japan
|Super Heavyweight bout.
|-
|Loss
|align=center|1-3
| James Thompson
|KO (punch)
|PRIDE Bushido 8
|
|align=center|1
|align=center|1:21
|Nagoya, Japan
|
|-
|Loss
|align=center|1-2
| Makoto Takimoto
|Decision (unanimous)
|PRIDE Shockwave 2004
|
|align=center|3
|align=center|5:00
|Saitama, Saitama, Japan
|
|-
|Win
|align=center|1-1
| Mal Foki
|KO (punches)
|PRIDE Bushido 5
|
|align=center|1
|align=center|0:21
|Osaka, Japan
|
|-
|Loss
|align=center|0-1
| Giant Silva
|Submission (kimura)
|PRIDE Total Elimination 2004
|
|align=center|1
|align=center|4:04
|Saitama, Saitama, Japan
|
|-

See also
List of male mixed martial artists
Glossary of sumo terms
List of past sumo wrestlers
List of non-Japanese sumo wrestlers

References

External links

1969 births
Living people
People from Tachikawa
American male mixed martial artists
American male kickboxers
American sumo wrestlers
American sportspeople of Japanese descent
Japanese male kickboxers
Japanese male mixed martial artists
Japanese people of African-American descent
Japanese sumo wrestlers
Kickboxers from Missouri
Mixed martial artists from Missouri
Sportspeople from St. Louis
Sportspeople from Tokyo
Sumo people from Tokyo
Heavyweight kickboxers
Super heavyweight mixed martial artists
Mixed martial artists utilizing Sumo
Mixed martial artists utilizing kickboxing